Oberea  is a species of longhorn beetle in the tribe Saperdini in the genus Oberea, discovered by Hayashi in 1976.

References

K
Beetles described in 1976